Iliopoulos is a Greek surname. Notable people with the surname include:

Vasileios Iliopoulos (born 1988), Greek tennis player
Dinos Iliopoulos (1915-2001), actor and film director
Giannis Iliopoulos (born 1979), basketball player 
John Iliopoulos (born 1940), theoretical physicist
Marios Iliopoulos (born 1969), heavy metal guitarist
Panourgias Iliopoulos (1787-1865), soldier of Theodoros Kolokotronis during the Greek War of Independence

Greek-language surnames
Surnames
Patronymic surnames